Victoria Andrea Bullett (born October 4, 1967) is an American former professional basketball player and current women's basketball head coach at West Virginia Wesleyan College.  She played for the Charlotte Sting and Washington Mystics in the WNBA, as well as for European and South American professional teams, the U.S. Olympic team, and the University of Maryland Terrapins. Bullett played at various times as a center, small forward, and power forward. She was inducted into the Women's Basketball Hall of Fame in 2011.

Early years
Bullett spent her childhood in Martinsburg, West Virginia.  She grew up playing backyard basketball with her six brothers.  One of her older brothers coached her high school basketball team and helped Bullett attract the attention of collegiate scouts. Bullett's younger brother Scott played Major League Baseball for the Pittsburgh Pirates and Chicago Cubs in the 1990s.

College career
Bullett is one of the most decorated players in the history of the women's basketball program at the University of Maryland, which she attended from 1985 to 1989.  Over the course of her college career, Bullett averaged 16.9 points per game and 8.5 rebounds per game.  She set Maryland records for points scored, field goals made, and rebounds recovered.  She led the Terrapins to three ACC titles and one NCAA Final Four.  In 1989, Bullett was named ACC Tournament MVP, ACC Player of the Year, and a Kodak All-American. She was also chosen for the All-ACC First Team in 1987, 1988, and 1989.

Bullett graduated from Maryland with a bachelor's degree in general studies. In 2001, she returned to school and earned an additional degree in social work. In 2015, she graduated from the United States Sports Academy with a master‘s degree in sports coaching.

After she graduated, the University of Maryland honored Bullett by retiring her jersey (#23).  She was also named a member of the ACC Women's Basketball 50th Anniversary team in 2003.  In 2007, Bullett was named an ACC Women's Basketball Legend.  She is also a member of the Maryland Athletics Walk of Fame.

Fellow left-handed forward Crystal Langhorne in 2007-2008 broke many of Bullett's Maryland career records.

USA Basketball 
Bullett was selected to the 1988 and 1992 United States Olympic Teams, which won gold and bronze medals, respectively.
She also played on the 1986 USA Select (junior national) team, the United States team which won the gold medal at the 1990 World Championships, and the United States team for the 1990 Goodwill Games.

Bullett was a member of the USA National team at the 1990 World Championships, held in Kuala Lumpur, Malaysia. The team won their opening round games fairly easily, with the closest of the first three games a 27-point victory over Czechoslovakia. Then they faced Cuba, a team that had beaten the US in exhibition matches only a few weeks earlier. The USA team was losing at halftime, but came back to win 87–78. The USA team found itself behind at halftime to Canada in their next game, but came back to win easily 95–70. After an easy match against Bulgaria, the USA team faced Czechoslovakia again, end achieved an almost identical result, winning 87–59. In the title match, the USA team won the gold medal with a score of 88–78. Bullett averaged 9.5 points per game.

Professional career
When the WNBA was founded in 1997, Bullett was assigned by the league to the Charlotte Sting in the Initial Player Allocation phase of the draft.  Over the next three seasons, Bullett started in all 90 Sting games and averaged more than 10 points per game.  In all three seasons, the Sting reached the WNBA Playoffs. In 1999, Bullett was named as a reserve to the inaugural WNBA Eastern Conference All-Star team, and played in the All-Star Game as a substitute for the injured Rebecca Lobo.

In January 2000, Bullett was traded to the Washington Mystics.  Over the next three seasons, she started in all 96 of the Mystics' games.  Bullett broke a WNBA record on July 3, 2001 by playing 55 minutes in the Mystics' quadruple-overtime victory over the Seattle Storm. Her cumulative WNBA accomplishments in six seasons included more than 800 field goals made, more than 1100 rebounds, more than 250 assists, more than 250 blocks, and more than 350 steals.

Bullett was also a renowned professional basketball player in Italy through much of the 1990s.  She played for Bari from 1990 to 1993, then for Cesena from 1993 to 1997. Four times during her career, Bullett was named an All-Star for the Italian league. In addition, Bullett played several years in Brazil for the Data Control/Fluminense professional team, which won the Brazilian league championship in 1998.

Coaching career
Bullett retired from the WNBA after the 2002 season, then retired from overseas professional play in 2007.  She moved back to Martinsburg, West Virginia, which renamed the street where she grew up "Vicky Bullett Street" in her honor.  She then taught for the Board of Education of Berkeley County, West Virginia and took graduate courses in education. She became a teacher at South Middle School in Martinsburg.  In January 2009, the Washington Mystics hired Bullett as an assistant coach. In June 2009, the Mystics announced that Bullett would also take on the responsibilities of Manager of Basketball Operations.

In June 2011, Bullett was inducted into the Women's Basketball Hall of Fame in Knoxville, Tennessee along with Ruthie Bolton, Muffet McGraw, Val Ackerman, Pearl Moore, and Lometa Odem.

Since leaving the Mystics in 2009, Bullett has taken the head coaching job for the women's basketball team at Hagerstown Community College in Hagerstown Maryland. In 2011, she signed on as assistant coach to Dr. Marlys Palmer. As of March 2012 Bullett has taken over the many roles needed to coach a successful coaching position. On May 10, 2016, she was named as the head coach for the women's basketball team at West Virginia Wesleyan College.

Career statistics

College
Source

WNBA

Source

Regular season

|-
| style="text-align:left;"| 1997
| style="text-align:left;"| Charlotte
| style="background:#D3D3D3"|28° || style="background:#D3D3D3"|28° || 31.3 || .448 || .304 || .775 || 6.4 || 2.3 || 1.9 || 2.0 || 2.4 || 12.8
|-
| style="text-align:left;"| 1998
| style="text-align:left;"| Charlotte
| style="background:#D3D3D3"|30° || style="background:#D3D3D3"|30° || 31.6 || .441 || .154 || .826 || 6.5 || 1.5 || 2.2 || 1.5 || 2.1 || 13.3
|-
| style="text-align:left;"| 1999
| style="text-align:left;"| Charlotte
| style="background:#D3D3D3"|32° || style="background:#D3D3D3"|32° || 31.5 || .486 || .370 || .773 || 6.8 || 1.6 || 1.9 || 1.4 || 1.9 || 11.5
|-
| style="text-align:left;"| 2000
| style="text-align:left;"| Washington
| style="background:#D3D3D3"|32° || style="background:#D3D3D3"|32° || 34.2 || .486 || .324 || .714 || 5.7 || 1.3 || 2.0 || 1.5 || 1.8 || 10.7
|-
| style="text-align:left;"| 2001
| style="text-align:left;"| Washington
| style="background:#D3D3D3"|32° || style="background:#D3D3D3"|32° || 33.5 || .392 || .297 || .729 || 7.2 || 1.3 || 1.7 || 1.8 || 1.7 || 8.7
|-
| style="text-align:left;"| 2002
| style="text-align:left;"| Washington
| style="background:#D3D3D3"|32° || style="background:#D3D3D3"|32° || 29.8 || .462 || .396 || .829 || 5.8 || 1.7 || 1.7 || 1.2 || 1.8 || 8.5
|-
| style="text-align:left;"| Career
| style="text-align:left;"|6 years, 2 teams
| 186 || 186 || 32.0 || .452 || .315 || .776 || 6.4 || 1.6 || 1.9 || 1.5 || 1.9 || 10.8

Playoffs

|-
| style="text-align:left;"| 1997
| style="text-align:left;"| Charlotte
| 1 || 1 || 40.0 || .417 || .000 || – ||  9.0 || 2.0 || 3.0 || 4.0 || 3.0 || 10.0
|-
| style="text-align:left;"| 1998
| style="text-align:left;"| Charlotte
| 2 || 2 || 34.5 || .250 || .000 || 1.000 || 6.0 || 4.0 || 3.0 || 1.5 || 0.5 || 8.0
|-
| style="text-align:left;"| 1999
| style="text-align:left;"| Charlotte
| 4 || 4 || 30.4 || .406 || .333 || .500 || 6.5 || 2.0 || 1.8 || 2.3 || 2.0 || 7.3
|-
| style="text-align:left;"| 2000
| style="text-align:left;"| Washington
| 2 || 2 || 34.5 || .500 || .571 || 1.000 || 4.5 || 1.5 || 2.5 || 2.5 || 1.0 || 15.0
|-
| style="text-align:left;"| 2002
| style="text-align:left;"| Washington
| 5 || 5 || 22.0 || .407 || .143 || 1.000 || 3.0 || .8 || 1.6 || 1.0 || 1.2 || 5.0
|-
| style="text-align:left;"| Career
| style="text-align:left;"| 5 years, 2 teams
| 14 || 14 || 29.2 || .391 || .300 || .875 || 5.1 || 1.8 || 2.1 || 1.9 || 1.4 || 7.9
|-

References

External links
 West Virginia Wesleyan profile
 WNBA profile

1967 births
Living people
African-American basketball coaches
African-American basketball players
All-American college women's basketball players
American expatriate basketball people in Brazil
American expatriate basketball people in Italy
American women's basketball coaches
American women's basketball players
Basketball coaches from West Virginia
Basketball players at the 1988 Summer Olympics
Basketball players at the 1992 Summer Olympics
Basketball players from West Virginia
Centers (basketball)
Charlotte Sting players
Junior college women's basketball coaches in the United States
Martinsburg High School alumni
Maryland Terrapins women's basketball players
Medalists at the 1988 Summer Olympics
Medalists at the 1992 Summer Olympics
Olympic bronze medalists for the United States in basketball
Olympic gold medalists for the United States in basketball
Sportspeople from Martinsburg, West Virginia
Power forwards (basketball)
Schoolteachers from West Virginia
American women educators
Small forwards
Washington Mystics players
Women's National Basketball Association All-Stars
Competitors at the 1990 Goodwill Games
21st-century African-American people
21st-century African-American women
20th-century African-American sportspeople
20th-century African-American women
20th-century African-American people
United States women's national basketball team players